Robert H. Serry (born c. 1950 in Kolkata) is a Dutch diplomat who served as the United Nations Special Coordinator for the Middle East Peace Process and the UN Secretary-General’s Personal Representative to the Palestine Liberation Organization and the Palestinian Authority from 2007 to 2015.

A career diplomat, Serry has served in a variety of diplomatic positions for his country's foreign service.

Biography
While in the Netherlands, he led the Middle East Division of the Dutch Ministry of Foreign Affairs. He participated in the events leading to the Madrid Middle East Peace Conference of 1991.

He was the Dutch ambassador to Ireland and has served as the Deputy Assistant Secretary-General for Crisis Management and Operations at the North Atlantic Treaty Organization (NATO). He has been posted to Moscow and New York (United Nations), and was the first Dutch ambassador to Kyiv, Ukraine. Following his Ukrainian posting Serry wrote a book about his experiences as an ambassador there, titled Standplaats Kiev, available in the Dutch and Ukrainian languages.

In early March 2014 he was sent to Crimea, Ukraine, to mediate the conflict between Russia and Ukraine, where he was held up by armed guards and was forced to abandon his mission.  Mr. Serry's appointment to the mediator role had been foreshadowed in a telephone conversation in February between Victoria Nuland, Undersecretary of State for Europe and Eurasian Affairs, and Geoff Pyatt, U.S. ambassador to Ukraine, on the subject of which political figures should form the next government of Ukraine.

Education and personal
He obtained his degree in political science from the University of Amsterdam.

Serry is married and has three children.

References

External links

1950 births
Living people
Politicians from Kolkata
Dutch officials of the United Nations
Permanent Representatives of the Netherlands to the United Nations
Ambassadors of the Netherlands to Ukraine
People of the Israeli–Palestinian conflict